Brayden Wiliame (born 17 December 1992) is a rugby league footballer who plays as a er and  forward for New Zealand Warriors in the NRL .

He has previously played for the Parramatta Eels, Manly Warringah Sea Eagles and St George Illawarra Dragons in the NRL, and the Catalans Dragons in the Super League.

Background
Wiliame was born in Gosford, New South Wales, Australia and is of Fijian-Rotuman descent.

He played his junior football for the Woy Woy Roosters, Umina Bunnies and Central Coast Harold Matthews Cup and S. G. Ball Cup squads, before signing a 3-year contract with the Melbourne Storm.

Playing career

2010-2012
From 2010 to 2012, Wiliame played for the Melbourne Storm's NYC team.

In June 2010, Wiliame played for the New South Wales Under-18s team.

In October 2010, Wiliame played for the junior Fiji team.

2013
In 2013, Wiliame joined the Parramatta Eels. In round 13 of the 2013 NRL season, Wiliame made his NRL debut for the Parramatta Eels against the Sydney Roosters.
He played six games for Parramatta in the 2013 NRL season as the club finished last on the table for a second consecutive year. At the end of 2013, Wiliame was released by the Parramatta Eels and joined the Newcastle Knights for the 2014 NRL season.

2014
On 1 October 2014, Wiliame signed a two-year contract with the Manly Warringah Sea Eagles starting in 2015.

2015
He made his debut for the Manly Warringah Sea Eagles in round 3 of the 2015 NRL season against the Canterbury-Bankstown Bulldogs.

2016
After playing on the wing in the opening two rounds of the 2016 NRL season, Wiliame was demoted to the Manly Warringah Sea Eagles' New South Wales Cup team to allow for the return from injury of fullback Brett Stewart. He was recalled to the side for the Manly-Warringah Sea Eagles' Anzac Day match against the Newcastle Knights in Newcastle following a broken collar bone suffered by winger Jorge Taufua a week earlier against Parramatta. Wiliame crossed for his first NRL try of the season. Manly-Warringah Sea Eagles ran out 26-10 winners over the bottom placed Newcastle.

After 23 first grade games with Manly Warringah Sea Eagles, Wiliame was granted a release from his contract with the club on 9 November 2016 in order to take up a two-year deal with the Catalans Dragons in the Super League.

2018
He played in the 2018 Challenge Cup Final victory over the Warrington Wolves at Wembley Stadium.

2019
On 17 December 2019, Wiliame signed a two-year deal to join St. George Illawarra starting in the 2020 NRL season.

2020-2021
On 16 September 2021, it was announced that Williame had been released by St. George Illawarra.

2022
On 11 November, Wiliame signed a two-year deal to join the New Zealand Warriors starting in 2023.

International career
On 2 May 2015, Wiliame played for Fiji against Papua New Guinea in the 2015 Melanesian Cup.

On 7 May 2016, Wiliame played for Fiji against Papua New Guinea in the 2016 Melanesian Cup.

References

External links

St. George Illawarra Dragons profile
Catalans Dragons profile
Manly Warringah Sea Eagles profile
SL profile
2017 RLWC profile

1992 births
Living people
Australian rugby league players
Australian rugby union players
Australian people of I-Taukei Fijian descent
Australian people of Rotuman descent
Catalans Dragons players
Fiji national rugby league team players
Parramatta Eels players
Manly Warringah Sea Eagles players
New Zealand Warriors players
Wentworthville Magpies players
Rugby league centres
Rugby league wingers
Rugby league players from Gosford, New South Wales
St. George Illawarra Dragons players
USA Perpignan players